Cryptoderma is a genus of weevils in the subfamily Dryophthorinae and the monotypic tribe Cryptodermatini.  Species records currently appear to be limited to eastern Asia.

Species
The Catalogue of Life lists:

 Cryptoderma andreae Pascoe F.P, 1885
 Cryptoderma brevipenne Ritsema C, 1882 
 Cryptoderma collare Ritsema C, 1882
 Cryptoderma convexum Ritsema C, 1882 
 Cryptoderma discors Bovie, 1908 
 Cryptoderma drescheri Günther, 1937
 Cryptoderma fabricii Ritsema C, 1882
 Cryptoderma formosense Kôno H, 1934
 Cryptoderma fortunei Waterhouse, 1853
 Cryptoderma fractisignum Heller KM, 1934
 Cryptoderma grande Fairmaire L, 1891
 Cryptoderma hydropicum Chevrolat LAA, 1853
 Cryptoderma inchoatum Marshall GAK, 1932
 Cryptoderma knapperti Veth, 1905
 Cryptoderma laterale Boheman C.H. in Schönherr C.J, 1833 
 Cryptoderma lobatum Ritsema C, 1905
 Cryptoderma longicolle Heller KM, 1924 
 Cryptoderma mac-gillavryi Veth, 1916
 Cryptoderma mangyanum Heller KM, 1924
 Cryptoderma maximum Heller KM, 1897
 Cryptoderma perakense Marshall GAK, 1932
 Cryptoderma philippinense Waterhouse, 1853
 Cryptoderma plicatipenne Ritsema C, 1912
 Cryptoderma regulare Ritsema C, 1882
 Cryptoderma rivulosum Boheman C.H. in Schönherr C.J, 1833
 Cryptoderma sancti-andreae Ritsema C, 1882
 Cryptoderma suturale Roelofs W, 1880

References

External links
 
 

Curculionidae genera
Insects of Asia